The  was a work written by Saint Bernard of Clairvaux  (1090 – August 20, 1153).  From its tone, content, and timing, its main purpose appears to have been to boost the morale of the fledgling Knights Templar in Jerusalem.

Background
The Knights Templar were most likely formed in January 1120, at the Council of Nablus.

Bernard begins the Liber de laude by directly addressing Hugh of Payens, the founder and first Master of the Templars, saying that Hugh has asked him three times to write an 'exhortation' (exhortatio) to his knights.

The reason for Hugh's persistence almost certainly lies in the fact that in the early 1120s, some of the first Templars were having doubts about the idea of an order of monks devoted to military combat in the crusades.  A letter from around this time written to the Templars by one 'Hugh the Sinner' (Hugo Peccator) spells out these doubts explicitly, noting that the Templars were worried about whether there was a genuine theological justification for monk-warriors.

Publication
The date of the Liber de laude is uncertain, although the fact it was addressed to Hugh of Payens, the first Master of the Templars, means it was written between 1120 (when the Templars were founded) and 1136, when Hugh died.

Content
The Liber de laude is divided into two parts:

The first section deals directly with the Knights Templar.  Bernard puts his weight firmly behind the Templars by comparing them with the regular knights of the age.  He criticizes the ordinary knights for their vanity, wanton violence, and pointlessness.  In contrast, he praises the Templars as noble, following a higher calling, fearless, and holy.
The second section is a description of the holy places in the crusader states.  By linking the Templars to these sacred sites, Bernard was presenting them as custodians of a key aspect of Christian heritage.

References

Further reading
 M Conrad Greenia and Malcolm Barber In Praise of the New Knighthood
 Peter Dinzelbacher, Bernhard von Clairvaux, second ed. Darmstadt 2012.

12th-century Latin books